The 2015–16 Washington Wizards season was the 55th season of the franchise in the National Basketball Association (NBA) and 43rd in the Washington, D.C. area. Coach Randy Wittman was fired and relieved of his duties after missing the playoffs and replaced by former Oklahoma City Thunder head coach Scott Brooks the following season.

Draft picks

Roster

Pre-season

|- style="background:#bfb;"
| 1 
| October 6
| Philadelphia
| 129–95
| Otto Porter (22)
| Garrett Temple (9)
| John Wall (9)
| Verizon Center11,670
| 1–0
|- style="background:#fbb;"
| 2 
| October 9
| New York
| 104–115
| Marcin Gortat (15)
| Bradley Beal (8)
| Sessions, Wall (4)
| Verizon Center14,267
| 1–1
|- style="background:#bfb;"
| 3
| October 11
| Bauru
| 134–100
| Marcin Gortat (19)
| Kris Humphries (9)
| John Wall (9)
| Verizon Center10,233
| 2–1
|- style="background:#bfb;"
| 4
| October 16
| @ Philadelphia
| 127–118
| Gortat, Oubre Jr. (16)
| DeJuan Blair (7)
| John Wall (14)
| Wells Fargo Center10,798
| 3–1
|- style="background:#bfb;"
| 5
| October 17
| @ Milwaukee
| 105–101
| Marcin Gortat (16)
| DeJuan Blair (14)
| Ramon Sessions (11)
| BMO Harris Bradley Center4,716
| 4–1
|- style="background:#fbb;"
| 6
| October 21
| @ Miami
| 105–110
| Marcin Gortat (18)
| Marcin Gortat (13)
| John Wall (7)
| American Airlines Arena19,600
| 4–2
|- style="background:#fbb;"
| 7
| October 23
| @ Toronto
| 82–92
| Marcin Gortat (16)
| Kris Humphries (14)
| John Wall (8)
| Bell Centre20,072
| 4–3

Regular season game log

|- style="background:#bfb;"
| 1
| October 28
| @ Orlando
| 
| Bradley Beal (24)
| Gortat, Porter (8)
| John Wall (6)
| Amway Center18,846
| 1–0
|-style="background:#bfb;"
| 2
| October 30
| @ Milwaukee
| 
| Bradley Beal (31)
| Marcin Gortat (15)
| John Wall (14)
| BMO Harris Bradley Center13,858
| 2–0
|-style="background:#fbb;"
| 3
| October 31
| New York
| 
| Bradley Beal (26)
| Drew Gooden (11)
| John Wall (7)
| Verizon Center20,356
| 2–1

|- style="background:#bfb;"
| 4
| November 4
| San Antonio
| 
| Bradley Beal (45)
| Marcin Gortat (10)
| John Wall (17)
| Verizon Center17,721
| 3–1
|- style="background:#fbb;"
| 5
| November 6
| @ Boston
| 
| Bradley Beal (23)
| Marcin Gortat (12)
| John Wall (9)
| TD Garden18,624
| 3–2
|- style="background:#fbb;"
| 6
| November 7
| @ Atlanta
| 
| Otto Porter (21)
| Marcin Gortat (10)
| John Wall (12)
| Philips Arena18,047
| 3–3
|- style="background:#fbb;"
| 7
| November 10
| Oklahoma City
| 
| Gortat, Sessions (27)
| DeJuan Blair (12)
| Sessions, Wall (7)
| Verizon Center20,356
| 3–4
|- style="background:#bfb"
| 8
| November 14
| Orlando
| 
| Kris Humphries (23)
| Gortat, Porter (10)
| John Wall (11)
| Verizon Center18,311
| 4–4
|- style="background:#bfb;"
| 9
| November 17
| Milwaukee
| 
| Porter, Wall (19)
| Marcin Gortat (9)
| John Wall (9)
| Verizon Center15,485
| 5–4
|- style="background:#bfb;"
| 10
| November 21
| @ Detroit
| 
| Nenê (18)
| Marcin Gortat (8)
| John Wall (7)
| The Palace of Auburn Hills15,890
| 6–4
|- style="background:#fbb;"
| 11
| November 24
| Indiana
| 
| Gary Neal (23)
| Marcin Gortat (9)
| John Wall (5)
| Verizon Center15,890
| 6–5
|-style="background:#fbb;"
| 12
| November 25
| @ Charlotte
| 
| Gortat, Wall (17)
| Marcin Gortat (12)
| John Wall (6)
| Time Warner Cable Arena17,064
| 6–6
|- style="background:#fbb;"
| 13
| November 27
| @ Boston
| 
| Jared Dudley (19)
| Marcin Gortat (9)
| John Wall (6)
| TD Garden18,624
| 6–7
|- style="background:#fbb;"
| 14
| November 28
| Toronto
| 
| Bradley Beal (20)
| Marcin Gortat (10)
| Bradley Beal (6)
| Verizon Center16,841
| 6–8

|- style="background:#bfb;"
| 15
| December 1
| @ Cleveland
| 
| John Wall (35)
| Marcin Gortat (11)
| John Wall (10)
| Quicken Loans Arena20,562
| 7–8
|- style="background:#fbb;"
| 16
| December 2
| L. A. Lakers
| 
| John Wall (34)
| Marcin Gortat (10)
| John Wall (11)
| Verizon Center20,356
| 7–9
|- style="background:#bfb;"
| 17
| December 4
| Phoenix
| 
| Bradley Beal (34)
| Bradley Beal (9)
| John Wall (9)
| Verizon Center17,255
| 8–9
|- style="background:#fbb;"
| 18
| December 6
| Dallas
| 
| John Wall (28)
| Otto Porter Jr. (11)
| John Wall (10)
| Verizon Center16,394
| 8–10
|- style="background:#bfb;"
| 19
| December 7
| @ Miami
| 
| John Wall (26)
| Otto Porter Jr. (14)
| John Wall (7)
| AmericanAirlines Arena19,500
| 9–10
|- style="background:#fbb;"
| 20
| December 9
| Houston
| 
| John Wall (26)
| Marcin Gortat (13)
| John Wall (12)
| Verizon Center16,041
| 9–11
|- style="background:#fbb;"
| 21
| December 11
| @ New Orleans
| 
| John Wall (26)
| Marcin Gortat (8)
| John Wall (12)
| Smoothie King Center16,875
| 9–12
|- style="background:#bfb;"
| 22
| December 12
| @ Dallas
| 
| John Wall (26)
| Marcin Gortat (12)
| John Wall (16)
| American Airlines Center20,088
| 10–12
|- style="background:#fbb;"
| 23
| December 14
| @ Memphis
| 
| Gary Neal (24)
| Marcin Gortat (9)
| John Wall (9) 
| FedExForum15,397
| 10–13
|- style="background:#fbb;"
| 24
| December 16
| @ San Antonio
| 
| Gortat, Wall (20) 
| Marcin Gortat (10)
| John Wall (11) 
| AT&T Center18,418
| 10–14
|-style="background:#bfb;"
| 25
| December 19
| Charlotte
| 
| John Wall (27) 
| Jared Dudley (9)
| John Wall (12) 
| Verizon Center16,987
| 11–14
|- style="background:#bfb;"
| 26
| December 21
| Sacramento
| 
| Marcin Gortat (27)
| Marcin Gortat (16)
| John Wall (19)
| Verizon Center15,124
| 12–14
|- style="background:#bfb;"
| 27
| December 23
| Memphis
| 
| Garrett Temple (20)
| Marcin Gortat (12)
| John Wall (14) 
| Verizon Center15,879
| 13–14
|- style="background:#bfb;"
| 28
| December 26
| @ Brooklyn
| 
| Marcin Gortat (25)
| Gortat, Humphries (14)
| John Wall (13)
| Barclays Center17,732
| 14–14
|- style="background:#fbb;"
| 29
| December 28
| L. A. Clippers
| 
| John Wall (23)
| Marcin Gortat (16)
| John Wall (12) 
| Verizon Center20,356
| 14–15
|- style="background:#fbb;"
| 30
| December 30
| @ Toronto
| 
| Otto Porter Jr. (20)
| Gortat, Porter Jr. (9)
| John Wall (11)  
| Air Canada Centre19,800
| 14–16

|- style="background:#bfb;"
| 31
| January 1
| Orlando
| 
| John Wall (24)
| Marcin Gortat (14)
| John Wall (13)  
| Verizon Center16,986
| 15–16
|- style="background:#fbb;"
| 32
| January 3
| Miami
| 
| John Wall (14)
| Marcin Gortat (13)
| Sessions, Wall (5)  
| Verizon Center17,793
| 15–17
|- style="background:#fbb;"
| 33
| January 6
| Cleveland
| 
| Garrett Temple (21)
| Otto Porter Jr. (7)
| John Wall (12)  
| Verizon Center20,356
| 15–18
|- style="background:#fbb;"
| 34
| January 8
| Toronto
| 
| John Wall (21)  
| Marcin Gortat (10)
| Dudley, Wall (4)  
| Verizon Center17,064
| 15–19
|- style="background:#bfb;"
| 35
| January 9
| @ Orlando
| 
| John Wall (24)  
| Marcin Gortat (10) 
| John Wall (10)  
| Amway Center18,058
| 16–19
|- style="background:#bfb;"
| 36
| January 11
| @ Chicago
| 
| John Wall (17)  
| Drew Gooden (12)
| John Wall (10) 
| United Center21,409
| 17–19
|- style="background:#bfb;"
| 37
| January 13
| Milwaukee
| 
| John Wall (19)  
| Jared Dudley (6)
| John Wall (8) 
| Verizon Center16,248
| 18–19
|- style="background:#bfb;"
| 38
| January 15
| @ Indiana
| 
| John Wall (28)   
| Nenê (8)
| John Wall (8) 
| Bankers Life Fieldhouse18,165
| 19–19
|- style="background:#fbb;"
| 39
| January 16
| Boston
| 
| John Wall (36)  
| Marcin Gortat (11) 
| John Wall (13)
| Verizon Center20,356
| 19–20
|- style="background:#fbb;"
| 40
| January 18
| Portland
| 
| Garrett Temple (18)
| Marcin Gortat (13) 
| John Wall (10) 
| Verizon Center17,236
| 19–21
|- style="background:#bfb;"
| 41
| January 20
| Miami
| 
| Beal, Wall (18)
| Marcin Gortat (12)
| John Wall (10)
| Verizon Center17,008
| 20–21
|- style="background:#fbb;"
| 42
| January 25
| Boston
| 
| Dudley, Porter Jr. (15)
| Marcin Gortat (11)
| John Wall (10) 
| Verizon Center11,753
| 20–22
|- style="background:#fbb;"
| 43
| January 26
| @ Toronto
| 
| John Wall (18)
| Gortat, Porter Jr. (8)
| John Wall (14) 
| Air Canada Centre 19,800
| 20–23
|- style="background:#fbb;"
| 44
| January 28
| Denver
| 
| Garrett Temple (20)
| Marcin Gortat (10)
| John Wall (9)
| Verizon Center15,146
| 20–24
|- style="background:#bfb;"
| 45
| January 30
| @ Houston
| 
| John Wall (19)
| Marcin Gortat (11)
| John Wall (13) 
| Toyota Center18,320
| 21–24

|- style="background:#fbb;"
| 46
| February 1
| @ Oklahoma City
| 
| Bradley Beal (18)
| Marcin Gortat (6)
| John Wall (8) 
| Chesapeake Energy Arena18,203
| 21–25
|- style="background:#fbb;"
| 47
| February 3
| Golden State
| 
| John Wall (41) 
| Marcin Gortat (8)
| John Wall (10) 
| Verizon Center20,356
| 21–26
|- style="background:#bfb;"
| 48
| February 5
| Philadelphia
| 
| Bradley Beal (22)
| Gortat, Wall (13)
| John Wall (10)
| Verizon Center17,305
| 22–26
|- style="background:#fbb;"
| 49
| February 6
| @ Charlotte
| 
| John Wall (23) 
| Marcin Gortat (13)
| John Wall (10) 
| Time Warner Cable Arena18,450
| 22–27
|- style="background:#bfb;"
| 50
| February 9
| @ New York
| 
| John Wall (28) 
| Marcin Gortat (10)
| John Wall (17)  
| Madison Square Garden19,812
| 23–27
|- style="background:#fbb;"
| 51
| February 11
| @ Milwaukee
| 
| Bradley Beal (19)
| Marcin Gortat (10)
| John Wall (10) 
| BMO Harris Bradley Center14,172
| 23–28
|- align="center"
|colspan="9" bgcolor="#bbcaff"|All-Star Break
|- style="background:#bfb;"
| 52
| February 18
| Utah
| 
| Marcin Gortat (22)
| Marcin Gortat (10)
| John Wall (11) 
| Verizon Center12,415
| 24–28
|- style="background:#bfb;"
| 53
| February 19
| Detroit
| 
| John Wall (22)
| Marcin Gortat (9)
| John Wall (8)
| Verizon Center20,356
| 25–28
|- style="background:#fbb;"
| 54
| February 20
| @ Miami
| 
| Jared Dudley (16)
| Marcin Gortat (13)
| John Wall (4) 
| American Airlines Arena19,710
| 25–29
|- style="background:#bfb;"
| 55
| February 23
| New Orleans
| 
| Marcin Gortat (21)
| John Wall (12)
| John Wall (11)
| Verizon Center15,743
| 26–29
|- style="background:#fbb;"
| 56
| February 24
| @ Chicago
| 
| Bradley Beal (19)
| Markieff Morris (10)
| John Wall (7)
| United Center21,560
| 26–30
|- style="background:#bfb;"
| 57
| February 26
| @ Philadelphia
| 
| John Wall (23)
| Marcin Gortat (11)
| John Wall (11)
| Wells Fargo Center16,511
| 27–30
|- style="background:#bfb;"
| 58
| February 28
| Cleveland
| 
| Porter Jr., Wall (21)
| Marcin Gortat (9)
| John Wall (13)
| Verizon Center20,356
| 28–30
|- style="background:#bfb;"
| 59
| February 29
| Philadelphia
| 
| John Wall (37)
| Marcin Gortat (20)
| John Wall (7)
| Verizon Center15,096
| 29–30

|- style="background:#bfb;"
| 60
| March 2
| @ Minnesota
| 
| Bradley Beal (26)
| Markieff Morris (6)
| John Wall (12)
| Target Center11,307
| 30-30
|- style="background:#fbb;"
| 61
| March 4
| @ Cleveland
| 
| John Wall (17)
| Marcin Gortat (9)
| John Wall (7)
| Quicken Loans Arena20,562
| 30–31
|-style="background:#fbb;"
| 62
| March 5
| Indiana
| 
| John Wall (25)
| Marcin Gortat (17)
| John Wall (12)
| Verizon Center20,356
| 30–32
|-style="background:#fbb;"
| 63
| March 8
| @ Portland
| 
| John Wall (20)
| Marcin Gortat (10)
| John Wall (11) 
| Moda Center19,393
| 30–33
|- style="background:#fbb;"
| 64
| March 11
| @ Utah
| 
| John Wall (24)
| Gortat, Morris, Sessions, Wall (4)
| John Wall (9)
| Vivint Smart Home Arena19,911
| 30–34
|- style="background:#fbb;"
| 65
| March 12
| @ Denver
| 
| Otto Porter Jr. (23)
| Markieff Morris (6)
| John Wall (11)
| Pepsi Center13,213
| 30–35
|- style="background:#bfb;"
| 66
| March 14
| Detroit
| 
| Nenê (20)
| Gortat, Porter Jr. (6)
| John Wall (12)
| Verizon Center18,042
| 31–35
|- style="background:#bfb;"
| 67
| March 16
| Chicago
| 
| John Wall (29)
| John Wall (10)
| John Wall (12)
| Verizon Center19,556
| 32–35
|- style="background:#bfb;"
| 68
| March 17
| @ Philadelphia
| 
| John Wall (16)
| Gortat, Wall (13)
| John Wall (14)
| Wells Fargo Center10,521
| 33–35
|- style="background:#bfb;"
| 69
| March 19
| New York
| 
| John Wall (24)
| Marcin Gortat (11)
| John Wall (10)
| Verizon Center20,356
| 34–35
|- style="background:#bfb;"
| 70
| March 21
| @ Atlanta
| 
| John Wall (27)
| Porter Jr. (10)
| John Wall (14)
| Philips Arena15,729
| 35–35
|- style="background:#fbb;"
| 71
| March 23
| Atlanta
| 
| Marcus Thornton (23)
| Marcin Gortat (14)
| John Wall (10)
| Verizon Center18,807
| 35–36
|- style="background:#fbb;"
| 72
| March 25
| Minnesota
| 
| Bradley Beal (26)
| Marcin Gortat (14)
| John Wall (16)
| Verizon Center20,356
| 35–37
|- style="background:#bfb;"
| 73
| March 27
| @ L. A. Lakers
| 
| John Wall (22)
| Marcin Gortat (10)
| John Wall (13)
| Staples Center18,997
| 36–37
|- style="background:#fbb;"
| 74
| March 29
| @ Golden State
| 
| Bradley Beal (17)
| Marcin Gortat (11)
| John Wall (11)
| Oracle Arena19,596
| 36–38
|- style="background:#fbb;"
| 75
| March 30
| @ Sacramento
| 
| Bradley Beal (24)
| Marcin Gortat (12)
| John Wall (13)
| Sleep Train Arena17,185
| 36–39

|- style="background:#bfb;"
| 76
| April 1
| @ Phoenix
|  
| John Wall (22)
| Marcin Gortat (11)
| John Wall (10)
| Talking Stick Resort Arena17,345
| 37–39
|- style="background:#fbb;"
| 77
| April 3
| @ L. A. Clippers
|  
| Marcin Gortat (21)
| Nenê (9)
| John Wall (13)
| Staples Center19,060
| 37–40
|- style="background:#bfb;"
| 78
| April 6
| Brooklyn
| 
| Bradley Beal (25)
| Marcin Gortat (12)
| Ramon Sessions (13)
| Verizon Center16,846
| 38–40
|- style="background:#fbb;"
| 79
| April 8
| @ Detroit
| 
| Markieff Morris (29)
| Otto Porter Jr. (8)
| Ramon Sessions (6)
| The Palace of Auburn Hills18,207
| 38–41
|- style="background:#bfb;"
| 80
| April 10
| Charlotte
| 
| Marcin Gortat (21)
| Marcin Gortat (13)
| Ramon Sessions (11)
| Verizon Center19,187
| 39–41
|- style="background:#bfb;"
| 81
| April 11
| @ Brooklyn
|  
| Ramon Sessions (21)
| Marcin Gortat (8)
| Ramon Sessions (12)
| Barclays Center14,653
| 40–41
|- style="background:#bfb;"
| 82
| April 13
| Atlanta
| 
| Ramon Sessions (22)
| J.J. Hickson (12)
| Nenê (8)
| Verizon Center17,399
| 41–41

Transactions

Trades

Free agents

Re-signed

Additions

Subtractions

References

Washington Wizards seasons
Washington Wizards
Washington Wizards
Washington Wizards